Meryta salicifolia is a species of plant in the family Araliaceae. It is endemic to French Polynesia.

References

Flora of French Polynesia
salicifolia
Critically endangered plants
Taxonomy articles created by Polbot